WAP four-disulfide core domain protein 1 is a protein that in humans is encoded by the WFDC1 gene.

This gene encodes a member of the WAP-type four disulfide core domain family. The WAP-type four-disulfide core domain, or WAP signature motif, contains eight cysteines forming four disulfide bonds at the core of the protein, and functions as a protease inhibitor in many family members. The encoded protein shares 81% amino acid identity with the rat ps20 protein, which was originally identified as a secreted growth inhibitor. This gene is mapped to chromosome 16q24, an area of frequent loss of heterozygosity in cancers, including prostate, breast and hepatocellular cancers and Wilms' tumor. Owing to its location and a possible growth inhibitory property of its gene product, this gene is suggested to be a tumor suppressor gene.

References

Further reading